Uetoayamix is a remix album by Japanese pop singer Aya Ueto. It was released on August 24, 2005, on Flight Master.

Background
The album was initially scheduled for release on March 2, 2005, but was eventually postponed. The original plans to include a bonus DVD and 20-page booklet were also scrapped. Two remixes found on the early track listing, "Pureness (Next Evidence Mix)" and "Namida wo Fuite (Steph Pockets Mix)" also went unreleased.

Chart performance
Uetoayamix peaked at #30 on the Oricon Daily Albums Chart and debuted at #47 on the Weekly Albums Chart with 5,980 copies sold. The album charted for a total of two weeks and sold over 7,000 copies.

Track listing

Charts and sales

References

Aya Ueto albums
2005 remix albums
Pony Canyon remix albums